Arani is an Indian and Azerbaijani name which is used as a given name and a surname. In Azerbaijani the word refers to "aryan" and also to "someone from Aran."

People with the name include:

Given name
 Aarani Satyanarayana (1898–1969), Telugu film and drama actor

Surname
Taqi Arani (1903–1940), Iranian political activist

See also
Arani

References

Indian words and phrases
Azerbaijani words and phrases